Lu Yen-hsun was the defending champion but chose not to defend his title.

Zhang Ze won the title after Henri Laaksonen retired at 2–6, 5–2 in the final.

Seeds

Draw

Finals

Top half

Bottom half

References
Main Draw
Qualifying Draw

Chengdu Challenger - Singles
2018 Singles